Johor-Riau may refer to:

Johor-Riau-Lingga-Pahang; a former Malay sultanate that partitioned into 2 following the Anglo Dutch Treaty in 1824:
Johor Sultanate, the Johor mainland and its dependencies in Pahang
Riau Sultanate, the Riau archipelago and its dependencies in Lingga

In linguistics, Johor-Riau is a dialect of the Malaysian and Indonesian languages. Standard Malay is based on the Johore-Riau dialect of Malay.